KAKN is a non-commercial Christian radio station airing Contemporary Christian music and Southern gospel music in Naknek, Alaska, broadcasting on 100.9 FM.

Translators
In addition to the main station, KAKN is relayed by an additional two translators to widen its broadcast area.

KAKN is also simulcast in Dillingham, Alaska on sister station KAKD (104.9 MHz).

External links
 Victory Radio's Website
 
 

Southern Gospel radio stations in the United States
Radio stations established in 1987
1987 establishments in Alaska
AKN